The men's 50 metre rifle prone event at the 2016 Olympic Games took place on 12 August 2016 at the National Shooting Center.

The event consisted of two rounds: a qualifier and a final. In the qualifier, each shooter fired 60 shots with a .22 long rifle at 50 metres distance from the prone position. Scores for each shot were in increments of 1, with a maximum score of 10.

The top 8 shooters in the qualifying round moved on to the final round. There, they fired an additional 10 shots. These shots were scored in increments of .1, with a maximum score of 10.9. The total score from all 70 shots were used to determine final ranking.

The medals were presented by Syed Shahid Ali, IOC member, Pakistan and Yair Davidovich, Council Member of the International Shooting Sport Federation.

Records

Prior to this competition, the existing world and Olympic records were as follows.

Qualification round

Final
The final was changed according to the ISSF regulations. Athletes must fire 6 shots in 2×3 series before the lowest-ranked was eliminated in every other shot.

References

Shooting at the 2016 Summer Olympics
Men's 050m prone 2016
Men's events at the 2016 Summer Olympics